Autopsie Vol. 4 is a mixtape by French rapper Booba, released on 15 November 2011. In the featuring guests, Kaaris, Gato, Niro and Shay.

The mixtape was greatly popular reaching number 2 in SNEP, the official French Albums Chart, staying for a total of 23 weeks in the chart. It also charted in Ultratop Belgian French Charts and in Switzerland.

Track listing

Charts

References

External links
 
 

2011 mixtape albums
Booba albums
Sequel albums